Allpakallpa is a 1975 Peruvian drama film directed by Bernardo Arias. It was entered into the 9th Moscow International Film Festival where it won a Silver Prize.

Cast
 Zully Azurin as Valicha
 Tulio Loza as Nemesio (as Tulio Loza Bonifaz)
 Jorge Pool Cano as Teacher
 Cuchita Salazar as Doralina
 Hudson Valdiva as Landowner

References

External links
 

1975 films
1975 drama films
1970s Peruvian films
1970s Spanish-language films
Peruvian drama films
Revolutionary Government of the Armed Forces of Peru